Heo Byeong-ho (born 27 November 1966) is a South Korean wrestler. He competed at the 1988 Summer Olympics and the 1992 Summer Olympics.

References

1966 births
Living people
South Korean male sport wrestlers
Olympic wrestlers of South Korea
Wrestlers at the 1988 Summer Olympics
Wrestlers at the 1992 Summer Olympics
Place of birth missing (living people)
20th-century South Korean people